Yvonne Makouala is a Congolese handball player. She competed in the women's tournament at the 1980 Summer Olympics.

References

Year of birth missing (living people)
Living people
Republic of the Congo female handball players
Olympic handball players of the Republic of the Congo
Handball players at the 1980 Summer Olympics
Place of birth missing (living people)